The Journal of Business Ethics is a peer-reviewed academic journal published by Springer Nature B.V. The Journal of Business Ethics is one of the journals used by the Financial Times for in compiling the Business Schools research rank.  

The Journal of Business Ethics was founded by Alex C. Michalos (Institute for Social Research and Evaluation, University of Northern British Columbia) and Deborah C. Poff (Department of Philosophy, Carleton University). Professors Michalos and Poff served as the journal’s Editors in Chief from its inception in 1982 to 2016. They were succeeded by R. Edward Freeman (Darden Business School, University of Virginia) and Michelle Greenwood (Department, of Management, Monash University) in 2016. Professor Freeman retired from the Journal in 2021 and was succeeded by Gazi Islam (Grenoble Ecole de Management).  Consequently, the current Editors in Chief are Michelle Greenwood and Gazi Islam.

Aims and Scope 
The Journal of Business Ethics aims to improve the human condition by providing a public forum for discussion and debate about ethical issues related to business. The journal’s emphasis is on the “ethics” of business ethics, with the goal of promoting dialogue between diverse publics, both academic and civil society.

The editors encourage a broad scope, and the JBE publishes original articles from a wide variety of methodological and disciplinary perspectives concerning ethical issues related to business that bring something new or unique to the discourse in their field.  The term `business' is understood in a wide sense to include all systems involved in the exchange of goods and services, while `ethics' concerns human action aimed at promoting a good life. Systems of production, consumption, marketing, advertising, social and economic accounting, labour relations, public relations and organisational behaviour are analysed from a moral viewpoint. Speculative philosophy as well as reports of empirical research are welcomed. The style and level of dialogue involve all who are interested in business ethics – civil society,  business actors, universities, government agencies and consumer groups.

Sections 
To accommodate this wide scope, the journal has within it the following 33 sections:

 Accounting and Business Ethics
 Arts, Humanities, and Business Ethics
 Behavioural Business Ethics
 Book (and More) Reviews
 Business Ethics Learning and Education
 Consumer Ethics
 Corporate Governance and Business Ethics
 Corporate Responsibility: Theoretical/Qualitative Issues
 Corporate Responsibility: Quantitative Issues
 Corporate Sustainability and Business Ethics
 Critical Studies and Business Ethics
 Cross-cultural Management and Business Ethics
 Economics and Business Ethics
 Environment and Business Ethics
 Feminisms and Business Ethics
 Finance and Business Ethics
 Global Issues and Business Ethics
 Human Resource Management and Development and Business Ethics
 Labour Relations and Business Ethics
 Law, Public Policy, and Business Ethics
 Leadership and Ethics: Philosophical Perspectives and Qualitative Analysis
 Leadership and Ethics: Quantitative Analysis
 Marketing Ethics
 Organisational Behaviour and Business Ethics
 Philosophy and Business Ethics
 Philosophy and Business Ethics
 Psychology and Business Ethics
 Religion, Spirituality and Business Ethics
 Small Business, Entrepreneurship and Business Ethics
 Social Entrepreneurship and Ethics
 Sociology and Business Ethics
 Strategy and Business Ethics
 Technology and Business Ethics

Descriptions and the names of the editors of each of these sections can be found on the Journal’s website.

Number of Volumes and Issues 
The Journal Business Ethics publishes seven volumes per year with each volume made up of four issues, i.e., 28 issues per year. The journal also publishes four Special Issues per year. The full list of issues can be found at on the JBE's website.

Abstracted and Indexed in

Impact Factor and Ranking 
The Journal of Business Ethics has a impact factor of 6.331 and a five year impact factor of 8.086 (2021 statistics).

The Journal is ranked 2nd out of 56 journals in the category of "Ethics" and 54th out of 152 journals in the category of "Business" by the Clarivates Journal Citation Reports® Ranking by Category.

See also 
 List of ethics journals

References

External links
 

Business ethics
Ethics journals
English-language journals
Publications established in 1982
Business and management journals